Sumita Sinha is an Indian politician. She was elected to the West Bengal Legislative Assembly from Kanthi Uttar as a member of the Bharatiya Janata Party.

References

Living people
Year of birth missing (living people)
21st-century Indian politicians
People from Purba Medinipur district
Bharatiya Janata Party politicians from West Bengal
West Bengal MLAs 2021–2026
Members of the West Bengal Legislative Assembly
Indian politicians